Acinetobacter apis is a gram-negative, obligate aerobic and non-motile bacterium from the genus Acinetobacter which has been isolated from the intestinal tract of the bee Apis mellifera. A. apis showed optimum growth at 25 degrees Celsius, pH 6–7, and in the presence of 1% (w/v) NaCl in trypticase soy broth medium. This bacterium was first characterized in 2014.

References

External links
Type strain of Acinetobacter apis at BacDive -  the Bacterial Diversity Metadatabase

Moraxellaceae
Bacteria described in 2014